Actinotus moorei, the splitleaf flannelflower, is an endemic Tasmanian perennial herb in the family Apiaceae. It is found in wet ground at high elevation in Tasmania's Central Plateau as well as western and south-western mountains.

Taxonomy
Actinotus moorei was described by Tasmanian dentist and botanist Leonard Rodway in 1896, based on a name by Ferdinand von Mueller.

Description
Actinotus moorei is a small tufted perennial herb that can reach 10 cm in height. It differs from other Actinotus species in Tasmania by its leaves, which have the lamina divided into three segments.

References

External links
 Key to Tasmanian Vascular Plants: Actinotus moorei
 Atlas of Living Australia: Distribution of Actinotus moorei

Flora of Tasmania
Endemic flora of Tasmania
moorei
Taxa named by Ferdinand von Mueller